The MAPATS (Man Portable Anti-Tank System, also a Hebrew word for explosion) is a laser guided, beam riding anti-tank guided missile (ATGM) developed by Israel Military Industries as a possible successor to United States' wire-guided missile, BGM-71 TOW. MAPATS is sometimes nicknamed Hutra (in Hebrew: חוטרא) – an Aramaic word for "stick".

MAPATS can operate day or night, while the gunner must direct a laser designator on the target until missile impact. First revealed in 1984, it has no trailing wire, so it can be fired over water at naval targets or from sea to land, unlike wire-guided ATGMs. The launcher has an elevation ability up to +30°. Externally, MAPATS is very similar in appearance to the TOW 2.

Versions 
The newer version of MAPATS, developed in the early 1990s, has a new solid-propellant rocket and better laser guidance. Some new warheads were developed by Rafael Advanced Defense Systems, including a tandem-charge high-explosive anti-tank (HEAT), and a high explosive (HE) bunker buster.

Operators

 
 
  No longer in service.
  No longer in service.

Characteristics
Effective range: 5,000 meters
Length: 145 cm
Caliber: 156 mm
Weight
Missile itself: 18 kg
Missile in canister: 29.5 kg
Launcher: 66 kg
Propulsion: 2 stage solid-propellant rocket
Penetration: 800 mm (original); 1200 mm (tandem-charge)
Guidance: laser-beam riding
Warhead: high-explosive anti-tank (HEAT), high explosive (HE)

Comparable systems
 HJ-9
 ZT3 Ingwe

References

Anti-tank guided missiles
Anti-tank guided missiles of Israel
Military equipment introduced in the 1980s